The FIS Nordic World Ski Championships 1939 took place February 11–19, 1939 in Zakopane, Poland. This was the Polish city's second time hosting the championships after having done so in 1929. It also marked the last time the event officially took place before World War II and the last time that these championships would be held on an annual basis (combined with the Winter Olympics) which they had been done since 1924.

Men's cross country

18 km 
February 15, 1939

50 km 
February 17, 1939

4 × 10 km relay
February 19, 1939

Men's Nordic combined

Individual 
February 11, 1939

Berauer was from Czechoslovakia, but competed for Germany after the Nazis occupied Czechoslovakia in 1938.

Men's ski jumping

Individual large hill 
February 11, 1939

Bradl was from Austria, but competed for Germany after the Nazis occupied Austria in 1938.

Medal table

References
FIS 1939 Cross country results
FIS 1939 Nordic combined results
FIS 1939 Ski jumping results
Results from German Wikipedia
Sellin spelling from the Swedish Ski Federation 
Hansen, Hermann & Sveen, Knut. (1996) VM på ski '97. Alt om ski-VM 1925-1997 Trondheim: Adresseavisens Forlag. p. 61. . 

FIS Nordic World Ski Championships
1939 in Nordic combined
Nordic skiing
Sports competitions in Zakopane
1939 in Polish sport
February 1939 sports events
Nordic skiing competitions in Poland